Laygyun Mibaya was the chief queen of Viceroy Minkhaung II of Toungoo (r. 1549–1550, 1552–1584). Self-proclaimed kings of Toungoo Minye Thihathu II and Natshinnaung were her son and grandson, respectively.

Born to the Prome royalty (and ultimately descended from the Ava royalty), she was married off to King Tabinshwehti of Toungoo Dynasty by her half-brother King Narapati of Prome in the 1530s. At Toungoo (Taungoo), she became a minor queen, living off the palace in a house located in the Laygyun Garden. She came to be known as Laygyun Mibaya (lit. "Queen of Laygyun"). In 1545, Tabinshwehti married his minor queen off to Zeya Nanda, who would later be known as Minkhaung II.

She had five children all by Minkhaung II. Her eldest son Minye Thihathu II married his first cousin Min Khin Saw, daughter of King Bayinnaung and Queen Sanda Dewi. All three of her daughters were married to their first cousin King Nanda in 1582.

Ancestry
The following is her ancestry as reported in the Hmannan Yazawin chronicle, which in turn referenced contemporary inscriptions.

Notes

References

Bibliography
 
 
 

Prome dynasty
Chief queens consort of Toungoo dynasty
16th-century Burmese women